The Serie B 2000–01 was the sixty-ninth tournament of this competition played in Italy since its creation.

Teams
Siena, Crotone, Cittadella and Ancona had been promoted from Serie C, while Torino, Venezia FC, Cagliari and Piacenza had been relegated from Serie A.

Final classification

Results

Serie B seasons
2000–01 in Italian football leagues
Italy